The following is a timeline of the history of the city of Madrid, Spain.

Prior to 17th century

 Prehistory: Quaternary period or  Lower Paleolithic- First archaeological signs of human occupation
 Roman period: mansion or staging-post (Miacum) established
 5th century AD – archaeological remains reported in 2007 indicate Visigoth occupation
 9th century – Muhammad I of Córdoba ordered the construction of an Alcazar
 1085  – Alfonso VI of León and Castile takes the city in the Reconquista.
 1339 – Treaty of Madrid secures collaboration between Aragon and Castile
 1499  –
Cardinal Cisneros founded the Complutense University.
Fernando de Rojas publishes La Celestina in Madrid
 1500 - Printing press in operation.
 1505 – San Jerónimo el Real built.
 1526 – Treaty of Madrid signed.
 1537 – Casa de Cisneros built.
 1547 - Birth of Miguel de Cervantes, later a Spanish writer.
 1559 – Convent of Las Descalzas Reales founded.
 1561
 Court of Philip II moves to Madrid.
 Population: 20,000.
 1584 – Bridge of Segovia built.

17th century

 1601 – Court of Philip III moves from Madrid to Valladolid.
 1605 - Cervantes' novel Don Quixote published.
 1606 – Court of Philip III returns to Madrid.
 1613 – Palace of the Councils built.
 1616 – Real Monasterio de la Encarnación inaugurated.
 1619 – Plaza Mayor laid out; Casa de la Panadería built.
 1633 – Church of San Antonio de los Alemanes built.
 1636 – Royal Alcazar built.
 1637 – Buen Retiro Palace built.
 1643 – Palacio de Santa Cruz built.
 1644 - Funeral of Isabel de Borbón.
 1661 – Gazeta de Madrid begins publication.
 1664 – San Isidro Church built.
 1672 – Premiere of Guevara–Hidalgo's zarzuela Celos Hacen Estrellas.

18th century

 1706 – City occupied by Portuguese.
 1713 – Royal Spanish Academy founded.
 1714 – Real Biblioteca del Palacio formed.
 1734 – Royal Alcazar burns down.
 1737 – Real Colegio de Profesores Boticarios established.
 1738 – Real Academia de la Historia founded.
 1743 – Teatro de la Cruz renovated.
 1751 – Compañía Guipuzcoana de Caracas headquartered in Madrid.
 1752 – Real Academia de Bellas Artes de San Fernando founded.
 1755 – Real Jardín Botánico founded.
 1756 –  built.
 1766 – Esquilache Riots.
 1767 – Buen Retiro Park opens.
 1774 –  (zoo) opens.
 1778 – Puerta de Alcalá inaugurated.
 1782 –  built on Plaza de Cibeles.
 1784 – San Francisco el Grande Basilica built.
 1790 – Plaza Mayor reconstructed.
 1798 – Royal Chapel of St. Anthony of La Florida built. Population: 170,000

19th century

 1808 – Dos de Mayo Uprising.
 1812 – Wellington takes city from the French.
 1817 – Moncloa Porcelain Factory in operation.
 1819 – Museo del Prado established.
 1830
 Royal Conservatory of Music founded.
  creates a scale model of the city.
 1831 – Bolsa de Madrid founded.
 1832 - Lhardy patisserie in business.
 1835 – Ateneo de Madrid founded.
 1836
 Biblioteca Nacional established.
 Literary University relocates to Madrid.
 1840 – Monumento a los Caidos por España inaugurated.
 1843 – Museo Naval de Madrid inaugurated.
 1850 – Teatro Real opera house opens.
 1851 – Estación de Mediodía inaugurated.
 1856
 Teatro de la Zarzuela opens.
  (school) founded.
 1864 – Hotel Paris opens.
 1866 – Sociedad de Conciertos de Madrid founded.
 1867 – National Archaeological Museum of Spain established.
 1868 – City walls dismantled.
 1869 - Jardín Zoológico established.
 1874 – Bull ring constructed on Plaza de Toros.
 1875 – Museo Nacional de Antropología inaugurated.
 1877 – Population: 397,816.
 1884 – Cementerio de la Almudena established.
 1885
 Roman Catholic diocese of Madrid established.
 Theatre of María Guerrero built.
 1887
 Café Comercial in business.
 Palacio de Cristal built.
 Population: 472,228.
 1888 – Café Gijón opens.
 1891 - Bank of Spain Building completed.
 1892 – Historical American Exposition held.
 1893 – Fábrica Nacional de Moneda y Timbre formed.
 1900 – Population: 539,835.

20th century

 1902 – Real Madrid C.F. (football club) founded.
 1903 – Madrid Symphony Orchestra formed.
 1905 – Parque del Oeste inaugurated.
 1909 – Cibeles Palace built.
 1910
 Museo Nacional de Ciencias Naturales established.
 Residencia de Estudiantes founded.
 1911
 Cuatro Vientos Airport opens.
 Metropolis Building inaugurated.
 1912 – Hotel Palace opens.
 1916 – Market of San Miguel constructed.
 1919 – Metro begins operating.
 1920 - Population: 750,896.
 1922 – Monument to Alfonso XII inaugurated.
 1923 – Teatro Monumental (theatre) built.
 1924
 Line 2 (Madrid Metro) begins operating.
 Hotel Florida opens.
 National Museum of Romanticism inaugurated.
 1925 – Teatro Pavón (theatre) opens.
 1928 - Catholic Opus Dei founded.
 1929
 Gran Vía constructed.
  opens.
 1930
 Teatro Munoz Seca (theatre) opens.
  built.
 1931
 City designated capital of Spanish Republic.
 Airport begins operating.
 Ministry of Foreign Affairs and Cooperation (Spain) headquartered in Madrid.
 1932 – Museo Sorolla and Cine Proyecciones (cinema) inaugurated.
 1934 – Museum of the Spanish Village formed.
 1935 – House-Museum of Lope de Vega and Cine Madrid-Paris (cinema) open.
 1936
 November: Siege of Madrid begins.
 Line 3 (Madrid Metro) begins operating.
 1939
 March: Siege of Madrid ends; Nationalists in power.
 Capital of Spanish State relocated to Madrid from Burgos.
 1940
 Spanish National Orchestra founded.
 Population: 1,088,647.
 1941 – Museum of the Americas founded.
 1944
 Carabanchel Prison built.
 Museum Cerralbo opens.
 Line 4 (Madrid Metro) begins operating.
 1946 – Estadio Santiago Bernabéu opens.
 1949 - Cine Pompeya (cinema) opens.
 1950 – Lope de Vega Theater opens.
 1951 – Museum of Lázaro Galdiano opens.
 1954 - Cine Benlliure (cinema) opens.
 1956 - Real Madrid wins first European Cup.
 1960 - Population: 2,259,931.
 1965 – RTVE Symphony Orchestra formed.
 1966 – Estadio Vicente Calderón opens.
 1967 – City flag design adopted.
 1968
 Autonomous University of Madrid established.
 Line 5 (Madrid Metro) begins operating.
 1969 – Comillas Pontifical University relocates to Madrid.
 1970 - Population: 3,146,071.
 1971 – Technical University of Madrid formed.
 1972
 Zoo Aquarium built.
 Temple of Debod installed.
 1973 – Operación Ogro.
 1974 - Line 7 (Madrid Metro) begins operating.
 1975 – La Movida Madrileña.
 1976 – Torres de Colón built.
 1977 – Massacre of Atocha.
 1978
 Sabatini Gardens open.
 Centro Dramático Nacional created.
 1979
 Line 6 (Madrid Metro) begins operating.
 Windsor Tower built.
 1980 - Line 9 (Madrid Metro) begins operating.
 1981 – Museo de Aeronáutica y Astronáutica founded.
 1982 – City hosts 1982 FIFA World Cup.
 1983
 Almudena Cathedral consecrated.
 November: Avianca Flight 011 accident.
 December: Alcalá 20 nightclub fire.
 1984 – Queen Sofía Chamber Orchestra formed.
 1987 – Community of Madrid Orchestra founded.
 1988 – National Auditorium of Music inaugurated.
 1989 – El Mundo begins publication.
 1990 -  in business.
 1991
 City hosts Israeli–Palestinian peace conference.
 Population: 2,984,576.
 1992
 Madrid–Seville high-speed rail line and Thyssen-Bornemisza Museum open.
 Museo Nacional Centro de Arte Reina Sofía and Juan Carlos I Park established.
 1994 – Festimad music festival begins.
 1996 – Gate of Europe and Islamic Cultural Center of Madrid built.
 1997 – Teatro Real reopens.
 1998 - Line 8 (Madrid Metro) and Line 11 (Madrid Metro) begin operating.

21st century

 2001 - City named World Book Capital by UNESCO.
 2002 – Madrid Arena opens.
 2003
 Alberto Ruiz-Gallardón becomes the new mayor, succeeding José María Álvarez del Manzano.
 Manzanares Park inaugurated.
 Line 12 (Madrid Metro) begins operating.
 2004
 March: Train bombings.
 Museo del Traje established.
 2005
 Windsor Tower suffers a major fire and becomes demolished afterwards.
 June: Demonstration against ETA.
 Madrid–Toledo high-speed rail line begins operating.
 Forest of Remembrance dedicated.
 Madrid Ballet established.
 2006
 Art Madrid contemporary art fair begins.
 Teatro Valle-Inclán opens.
 December: Airport bombing.
 2007 – Metro Ligero begins operating.
 2008
 Madrid–Barcelona high-speed rail line begins operating.
 Spanair Flight 5022 crash.
 Caixa Forum opens.
 Torre PwC, Torre Caja Madrid, Torre de Cristal, and Torre Espacio built.
 Saturday Night Fiber music festival held.
 2009 – Population: 3,264,497.
 2011
 15-M Movement protests.
  inaugurated.
 Ana Botella becomes the new City Mayor after Alberto Ruiz-Gallardón resigns.
 2012
 May: Economic protest.
 November: Anti-austerity protests.
 2013 – September: 4th bid for the Summer Olympic Games fails.
 2015
 March:  inaugurated.
 May: City Council election held; Manuela Carmena elected mayor.
 2019
 June: José Luis Martínez-Almeida elected mayor.
 2021
 January: Snowstorm 
 January: Explosion

Evolution of the Madrid map

17th century

18th century

19th century

20th century

21st century

See also
List of mayors of Madrid
History of Madrid
Madrid capital

References

Bibliography

in English
Published in the 18th-19th century
 
 
 
 
 
 
 
 

Published in the 20th century
 
 
 
 
 
 
 
 
 

Published in the 21st century

in other languages
 
 
 
  v.4

External links

  (Map of Madrid)
 Map of Madrid, 1943
 Europeana. Items related to Madrid, various dates.
 Digital Public Library of America. Items related to Madrid, various dates

 
Madrid
Madrid-related lists
Madrid